The 1984 Morgan Hill earthquake (also known as the Halls Valley earthquake) occurred on April 24 at  in the Santa Clara Valley of Northern California. The shock had a moment magnitude of 6.2 and a maximum Mercalli intensity of VIII (Severe). The epicenter was located near Mount Hamilton in the Diablo Range of the California Coast Ranges. Nearby communities (including Morgan Hill) sustained serious damage with financial losses of at least US$7.5 million.

Earthquake
The shock was felt in Sacramento in California's central valley.

Damage
Morgan Hill was the worst affected, with a number of mobile homes sliding off foundations, and moderate damage to several masonry buildings in the city. The communities of San Jose, San Martin and Coyote were some areas that experienced minor damage. In Santa Clara County, over 550 buildings were reported to have received at least minor damage.

Aftershocks
The outline of aftershocks show that the rupture propagated southeast over a  section of the fault, as far as San Martin, to the location of the 1979 Coyote Lake earthquake's mainshock. That event's aftershock zone also stretched to the southeast.

See also

 List of earthquakes in California

References

External links
 M 6.2 – Northern California – United States Geological Survey
 

1984
1984 earthquakes
1984 in California
April 1984 events in the United States